Harivarasanam is a Sanskrit devotional ashtakam (eight stanzas) dedicated to Hindu deity Ayyappan at the Sabarimala Sree Dharma Sastha Temple, situated in the state of Kerala, India. The song is sung as a lullaby to the deity at the temple as a ritual of putting the deity to sleep. The song became popular through the first stanza in the Kīrtanam known as "Hariharatmajashtakam" (ഹരിഹരാത്മജാഷ്ട്ടകം)

The exact origin of the song is unclear, but it is believed that Kambankudi Kulathu Iyer composed it. Also, it has been claimed recently that the song was written by Konnakathu Janaki Amma in 1923, as an offering to Lord Ayyappa. According to the claim she had submitted the work to her father, Ananthakrishna Iyer, who was the then Sabarimala Melshanthi (Chief Priest). But, the claim lacks any concurrent proofs, apart from handwritten notes.

The original version of the song is only sung vocally, inside the temple during the daily temple closing ceremony. The popular version of the song, which is sung differently from the original version is also played simultaneously through megaphones and speakers, for the devotees.

Background 

The first singers of Harivarasanam were the bhajan singers of Kalladaikurichi and later Purakkattu Anandeswaram Siva Temple. Devotees known as Kalladakkoottam (people from Kalladaikurichi) sang this song everywhere in Kerala and it started to become popular throughout the state. In the 1950s, Melsanthi Eswaran Nambudiri of Mavelikara started to recite this ashtakam in the Sabarimala temple, beside the sanctum, every night after the Athaazha Sheeveli (a ritual after the divine dinner) as a song to put Ayyappa to sleep.  

The song became extremely popular all over southern India, when it was included in the famous Malayalam film "Swami Ayyappan'' in 1975. The song was rendered by a Carnatic vocalist and playback singer K. J. Yesudas and composed in the Madhyamavati raga by composer late G. Devarajan. During his pilgrimage to Sabarimala in 2017, Yesudas claimed that the words ‘ari’ (enemy) and ‘vimardhanam’ (annihilation) in the lyrics should have been spelt separately, on behalf of the advice and new information he received from a scholar, and he would be happy to re-record it with due corrections. 

Mr Padmakumar had claimed that Harivarasanam was written by Konnakathu Janaki Amma, his grandfather’s sister, whose father, Ananthakrishna Iyer, was the head priest at Sabarimala from 1907 to 1920.

Lyrics
The song is in the Sanskrit language, originally written using Malayalam script.

Harivarasanam Award
The Harivarasanam Award is an award jointly instituted by the Government of Kerala and Travancore Devaswom Board. It is awarded for contributions towards propagation of secularism, equanimity and universal brotherhood of Sabarimala through music. It is being awarded since 2012. Each year, Harivarasanam Award is announced ahead of Makaravilakku festival in Sabarimala. The award consists of cash prize of 1 lakh, citations and plaque.

Harivarasanam Centenary Celebrations 
As it is known that Harivarasanam was originally written in the year 1920, and by the year 2023 Centenary celebrations are taken up by Sabarimala Ayyappa Seva Samajam across India. Celebrations were launched by the Governor of Tamil Nadu state, Maestro Ilayaraja - Music Director has been selected as National Committee Chairman for the same.

See also
Ayyappan
Shasta
Sabarimala
Mahishasuramardini Stotra

References

Sabarimala
Hindu devotional texts
Hindu texts
Lullabies